The 1826 Delaware gubernatorial election was held on October 3, 1826. Incumbent Federalist Governor Samuel Paynter was barred from seeking re-election to a second consecutive term. State Senator Charles Polk Jr. ran as the Federalist nominee to succeed Paynter, while 1823 Democratic-Republican nominee David Hazzard once again ran as his party's nominee. Polk ended up defeating Hazzard by a narrow margin, barely holding onto the governorship for the Federalists.

General election

Results

References

Bibliography
 
 
 

1826
Delaware
Gubernatorial